The Waimamakau River is a short river of the Northland Region of New Zealand's North Island. Confusingly, it is a tributary of the Waimamaku River, reaching the latter 10 kilometres southeast of Ōmāpere.

See also
List of rivers of New Zealand

References

Rivers of the Northland Region
Far North District
Rivers of New Zealand